Malzéville is a commune in the Meurthe-et-Moselle department in north-eastern France.

Population

Points of interest
 Arboretum de l'Abiétinée

See also
 Communes of the Meurthe-et-Moselle department

References

Communes of Meurthe-et-Moselle